Morton C. Hillman (died February 3, 2014) was an American politician who served in the New York State Assembly from the 26th district from 1987 to 1992.

He died on February 3, 2014, in Delray Beach, Florida, at age 87.

References

2014 deaths
Democratic Party members of the New York State Assembly
1926 births